WJMN-TV (channel 3) is a television station licensed to Escanaba, Michigan, United States, serving the Central and Western Upper Peninsula of Michigan as an affiliate of MyNetworkTV. The station is owned by  Nexstar Media Group, and maintains studios off US 41/M-28 on Wright Street in Marquette Township; its transmitter is located in unincorporated northern Delta County (south of the Alger County line).

Master control and internal operations for WJMN are based at the studios of Nexstar sister station and CBS affiliate WFRV-TV (channel 5) on East Mason Street in Green Bay, Wisconsin. Although identifying as a separate station in its own right, WJMN operated as a semi-satellite of WFRV, which established it in 1969 to expand its reach into Upper Michigan and far Northeastern Wisconsin.

On January 21, 2022, WJMN disaffiliated from CBS and became a MyNetworkTV affiliate, retaining previous syndicated programming, but also taking programming from Nexstar-owned classic television network Antenna TV to fill time where CBS programming formerly resided. The station also extended its existing 6 p.m. newscast to one hour, while moving its 11 p.m. newscast to a 10 p.m. hour. WZMQ (channel 19) acquired the CBS affiliation for its second digital subchannel.

History

Establishment as WFRV-TV satellite
As early as 1960, WFRV-TV began to analyze ways to extend its reach in the Upper Peninsula. The station had applied for channel 8 at Iron Mountain, Michigan, which was abandoned after WFRV-TV was sold that year alongside an application for channel 9 in Wausau, Wisconsin. Seven years later, Orion Broadcasting renewed the push by filing for channel 3 at Escanaba on June 20, 1967. A push by Northern Michigan University to use channel 3 instead of 13 for educational television use in the Upper Peninsula delayed approval until April 1969. From a transmitter site and new  near Trenary, WJMN-TV—so designated in honor of Jane Morton Norton, chairwoman of the board of Orion Broadcasting and a part of the Norton family that founded the company—began broadcasting October 7, bringing a full NBC lineup and WFRV-TV's signal to a further 50,000 households.

Orion Broadcasting reached a deal to merge with Cosmos Broadcasting, a subsidiary of the Liberty Corporation, in 1980. The merger would put the combined company over the limit for the number of VHF television stations it could own, prompting it to immediately announce that it would divest WFRV-WJMN. In January 1981, Cosmos found a buyer: Midwest Radio-Television, owners of WCCO radio and television in Minneapolis. The transaction closed in October.

WJMN's connection to WFRV meant that affiliation switches in Green Bay twice affected viewers in Marquette. In 1983, the two stations switched from NBC to ABC; this prompted the other established station in Marquette, WLUC-TV, to drop its ABC programming for NBC. The two stations then changed network affiliations one more time in 1992, after CBS purchased Midwest Radio-Television. This led to both stations joining CBS, but not at the same time. In Green Bay, WFRV became a CBS affiliate on March 15. However, the Marquette station brought its flip forward several weeks because WLUC-TV was upset at the short notice it received that CBS was disaffiliating. WJMN thus joined CBS on February 23, which required a special feed of WFRV with CBS programming to be sent from Green Bay for transmission.

On April 16, 2007, Liberty Media completed an exchange transaction with CBS Corporation pursuant to which Liberty exchanged 7.6 million shares of CBS Class B common stock valued at $239 million for a subsidiary of CBS (that held WFRV and WJMN) and approximately $170 million in cash.

Nexstar ownership and partial separation from WFRV

On April 7, 2011, the Nexstar Broadcasting Group announced it would acquire WFRV and WJMN from Liberty Media; the $20 million deal was both approved by the FCC and completed the week of July 1, 2011. Nexstar sought and received approval to continue operating WJMN-TV as a satellite station from Green Bay due to a weak regional economy.

On January 23, 2012, WFRV was rebranded to "Local 5". WJMN continued as "Channel 3" until 2014, when the station established its own news service and studios west of Marquette. At this time, certain network programs that were cleared an hour later than normal for the Eastern Time Zone (but simultaneously with WFRV-TV), such as CBS This Morning, began to be aired live.

Loss of CBS affiliation and switch to MyNetworkTV
On January 20, 2022, WJMN informed its viewers that it had lost the CBS affiliation effective the next day, with MyNetworkTV and Antenna TV programming replacing CBS network programs and the 11 p.m. late news moving to an hour at 10 p.m. The second digital subchannel of WZMQ (channel 19), a station owned by Lilly Broadcasting, became the new home of CBS programming in Marquette.

News operation
Usually, most semi-satellites of another station provide some coverage of the home territory (in this case, the Central Upper Peninsula of Michigan). WJMN-TV operated a one-person bureau out of Escanaba from the time of its sign-on in 1969, which was a requirement of its license. With relaxed FCC regulations, CBS chose in late summer of 1993 to close the bureau and reallocate those resources to WFRV's Green Bay operations. However, Upper Peninsula weather forecast segments were inserted into WFRV's newscasts for broadcast on WJMN-TV.

When it announced its purchase of WJMN and WFRV in 2011, Nexstar disclosed plans to expand its local news presence in Marquette. Nexstar's first tangible move toward a WJMN news operation came with a job posting in December 2013 seeking a news director/anchor for early and late weeknight newscasts. The company announced on March 13, 2014, that the station would launch Local 3 News on April 21 originating from new studios west of Marquette (known as the "WJMN-TV Plaza"). At the outset, WJMN's news output consisted of weeknight newscasts at 6 and 11 which are seen in full high definition.

The station retained its local newscasts after losing its CBS affiliation, with the 11 p.m. late newscast moving to 10 p.m. and expanding to an hour. The station also announced that it would simulcast Morning in America from sister cable news channel NewsNation.

Technical information

Subchannels
The station's digital signal is multiplexed:

Analog-to-digital conversion
WJMN signed on its digital signal on UHF channel 48 in 2002; originally, this signal operated at a very low-power from a transmitter west of Downtown Escanaba and was only available in the immediate area. A construction permit in July 2009 allowed the station to increase its power to 1 megawatt and move the digital signal back to its analog transmitter site. However, according to an engineer, this would not happen until sometime in 2010. Therefore, the updated digital signal of 9.8 kilowatts still could only be received in the immediate Escanaba and Gladstone areas.

WJMN-TV discontinued regular programming on its analog signal, over VHF channel 3, at around 1 a.m. (occurring within a commercial break during The Late Late Show with Craig Ferguson) on February 17, 2009, the original date in which full-power television stations in the United States were to transition from analog to digital broadcasts under federal mandate (which was later pushed back to June 12). The station's digital signal remained on its pre-transition UHF channel 48, using PSIP to display the station's virtual channel as its former VHF analog channel 3.

As part of the SAFER Act, WJMN kept its analog signal on the air until March 3 to inform viewers of the digital television transition through a loop of public service announcements from the National Association of Broadcasters.

References

External links

MyNetworkTV affiliates
Antenna TV affiliates
Ion Mystery affiliates
Laff (TV network) affiliates
Bounce TV affiliates
Television channels and stations established in 1969
1969 establishments in Michigan
JMN-TV
Nexstar Media Group